The molecular formula C6H12O5 (molar mass : 164.16 g/mol, exact mass : 164.068473) may refer to:

 1,5-Anhydroglucitol
 2-Deoxy-D-glucose
 5-Deoxyinositol
 Fucose
 Fuculose
 Rhamnose
 Sorbitan